Hans Jonas Henriksen (28 October 1903 – 4 September 1977) was a Norwegian proponent for Sami culture and language. He was born in Tana, Finnmark. From 1953 he chaired Samisk Råd for Finnmark, and from 1964 to 1971 he chaired the council Norsk Sameråd. He contributed to the five volume Lapp Dictionary (1932–1962; main editor Konrad Nielsen), and translated several books into Sami language. He edited the Sami newspaper Ságat for several years. He received the Arts Council Norway Honorary Award in 1974.

References

1903 births
1977 deaths
People from Tana, Norway
Norwegian newspaper editors
20th-century Norwegian writers